Dreptatea was a Romanian newspaper that appeared between 17 October 1927 and 17 July 1947, as a newspaper of the National Peasants' Party. It was re-founded on February 5, 1990 as a publication of the Christian-Democratic National Peasants' Party (Romania).

Editors
 Virgil Madgearu (1927–1928)
 George Ştefănescu (1928–1930)
 Petre Ciorănescu (1930–1932)
 Constantin Gongopol (1932–1934)
 Mihai Ralea (1934–1938)
 Demostene Botez (March – July 1938)
 Ion Livianu (1944) 
 Nicolae Carandino (1944–1947)

References

External links
 www.dreptatea.ro  

National Peasants' Party
Newspapers published in Bucharest
Publications established in 1927